RNLB Jesse Lumb (ON 822) is a historic lifeboat. Built by J. Samuel White in 1939, Jesse Lumb served as the lifeboat at Bembridge on the Isle of Wight from 1939 to 1970, becoming the last of her type in service. Since 2000 she has been preserved at Classic Boat Museum, Cowes. In August 1999 she was inscribed on the National Register of Historic Vessels, becoming part of the National Historic Fleet.

Design and construction
Jesse Lumb is a 46-ft Watson-class lifeboat constructed from mahogany with a diagonally planked double skin. She was powered by two diesel engines with twin propellers, and displaced 20.5 tons. Jesse Lumb was named in honour of the owner of Folly Hall Mill in Huddersfield, and her construction funded by a £9,000 bequest by Annie Lumb, Jesse Lumb's sister. The lifeboat was named on 21 July 1939.

Operational service
Commissioned in summer 1939 Jesse Lumb served throughout the Second World War, saving 138 lives during the conflict. On the night of 29/30 January 1940, Jesse Lumb spent 14 hours at sea in freezing weather while rescuing the crew of the trawler Kingston Cairngorm off Chichester. Coxswain Harry J Gawn was later awarded the Royal National Lifeboat Institution Bronze Medal. On 8 August 1940, during the Battle of Britain, Jesse Lumb went to the assistance of a Royal Air Force air-sea rescue launch that had been machine-gunned by German aircraft.
 
After the Second World War, Jesse Lumb participated in other notable rescues; on 5 December 1947 she rescued 18 crewmen from the trawler Erraid, and in 1968 assisted the diesel-electric submarine HMS Alliance after its stranding on Bembridge Ledge.

Preservation
Jesse Lumb's service at Bembridge ended in 1970. She then spent some years in the RNLI relief fleet before being acquired by the Imperial War Museum and placed on display at the museum's branch at Duxford in Cambridgeshire. She became part of the National Historic Fleet in August 1999, with certificate number 1759.

Notes

References

Ships and vessels of the National Historic Fleet
Ships preserved in museums
Collection of the Imperial War Museum
Watson-class lifeboats